William Thompkins may refer to:

 William H. Thompkins (1872–1916), Buffalo Soldier in the United States Army
 William J. Thompkins (1884–1944), physician and health administrator in Kansas City
 William R. Thompkins (1925–1971), American actor and stuntman